Elmalıya Yangınım(Elmalıya Vurgunum ) is a Turkish folkloric tune (Kaşık Havası) or tsifteteli(kanto).The meter is 8/8.

See also
Kaşık Havası
Konyali
Hamsheni mani

References

Turkish music
Turkish songs
Songwriter unknown
Year of song unknown